Luigi Brambilla (6 April 1899 – 29 April 1967) was an Italian racing cyclist. He rode in the 1924 Tour de France.

References

1899 births
1967 deaths
Italian male cyclists
Place of birth missing